Woodruff County is located in the Arkansas Delta in the U.S. state of Arkansas. The county is named for William E. Woodruff, founder of the state's first newspaper, the Arkansas Gazette. Created as Arkansas's 54th county in 1862, Woodruff County is home to one incorporated town and four incorporated cities, including Augusta, the county seat. The county is also the site of numerous unincorporated communities and ghost towns. Occupying only , Woodruff County is the 13th smallest county in Arkansas. As of the 2020 Census, the county's population was 6,269. Based on population, the county is the second-smallest county of the 75 in Arkansas. Located in the Arkansas Delta, the county is largely flat with fertile soils. Historically covered in forest, bayous and swamps, the area was cleared for agriculture by early settlers. It is drained by the Cache River and the White River. Along the Cache River, the Cache River National Wildlife Refuge (NWR) runs north–south across the county, preserving bottomland forest, sloughs and wildlife habitat.

Although no Interstate highways are located in Woodruff County, two United States highways (US 49 and US 64) and twelve Arkansas state highways run in the county. Two Union Pacific Railroad lines cross the county.

Geography

The county is located in the Arkansas Delta, one of the six primary geographic regions of Arkansas. The Arkansas Delta is a subregion of the Mississippi Alluvial Plain, which is a flat area consisting of rich, fertile sediment deposits from the Mississippi River between Louisiana and Illinois. Major hydrologic features include the Cache River, which roughly bisects the county north–south, Bayou De View, which runs through eastern Woodruff County, and the White River, which serves as the county's western boundary.

Prior to settlement, Woodruff County was densely forested, with bayous, sloughs, and swamps crossing the land. Seeking to take advantage of the area's fertile soils, settlers cleared the land to better suit row crops. Although some swampland has been preserved in the Cache River NWR and some former farmland has undergone reforestation, the majority (56 percent) of the county remains in cultivation. Another large land use in Woodruff County is the Cache River NWR, owned by the United States Fish and Wildlife Service. The NWR aggressively seeks willing property owners to sell land to add to the NWR's boundaries, adding  in 2015.

Woodruff County is surrounded by five other Delta counties: Jackson County to the north, Cross County to the northeast, St. Francis County to the southeast, Monroe County to the south and Prairie County to the southwest. West of Woodruff County is White County, which is something of combination point for the Delta, Ozarks, and Central Arkansas.

Climate
Woodruff County has a humid subtropical climate (Köppen Cfa). Woodruff County experiences all four seasons, although summers can be extremely hot and humid and winters are mild with little snow. Temperatures above  are not uncommon.

Communities

Four incorporated cities and one incorporated towns are located within the county. The largest city and county seat, Augusta, is located in the western part of the county near the White River and the White County border. Augusta's population in 2010 was 2,199—well below its peak of 3,496 at the 1980 Census. McCrory and Patterson are adjacent to each other, located near the county's center. Cotton Plant and Hunter are both located in the southern part of Woodruff County, with 2010 populations of 649 and 105, respectively.

Woodruff County has dozens of unincorporated communities and ghost towns within its borders. This is due to early settlers in Arkansas tending to cluster in small clusters rather than incorporated towns. For example, Fitzhugh and Gregory had post offices at some point in their history. Other communities are simply a few dwellings at a crossroads that have adopted a common place name over time. Some are officially listed as populated places by the United States Geological Survey, and others are listed as historic settlements.

Unincorporated communities

 Becton
 Dixie
 Fitzhugh
 Grays
 Gregory
 Hillemann
 Howell
 Little Dixie‡
 McClelland
 Morton
 New Augusta
 New Salem
 Pleasant Grove
 Pumpkin Bend
 Shady Grove

Historic communities

 Barson
 Bemis
 Bulltown
 Casey
 Cavell
 Colona
 Cow Mound
 Daggett
 DeView
 Flynn
 Four Forks
 Goodrich
 Kramer
 Maberry
 McGregor
 Morelock
 Negro Head Corner
 Overcup
 Penrose
 Quinlan
 Revel
 Riverside
 Simmons
 Sturdevant
 Taylorville
 Tip
 Union
 Wiville

Townships

 Augusta (Augusta)
 Barnes
 Cache
 Caney (Hunter)
 Cotton Plant (Cotton Plant)
 Dent
 De View (McCrory, Patterson)
 Franks
 Freeman
 Garden
 Point
 Pumpkin Bend
 White River

Demographics

2020 census

As of the 2020 United States Census, there were 6,269 people, 2,932 households, and 1,855 families residing in the county.

2000 census
As of the 2000 United States Census, there were 8,741 people, 3,531 households, and 2,439 families residing in the county.  The population density was 15 people per square mile (6/km2).  There were 4,089 housing units at an average density of 7 per square mile (3/km2).  The racial makeup of the county was 67.86% White, 30.75% Black or African American, 0.23% Native American, 0.07% Asian, 0.10% Pacific Islander, 0.17% from other races, and 0.81% from two or more races.  0.79% of the population were Hispanic or Latino of any race.

There were 3,531 households, out of which 30.90% had children under the age of 18 living with them, 48.60% were married couples living together, 16.70% had a female householder with no husband present, and 30.90% were non-families. 28.20% of all households were made up of individuals, and 14.20% had someone living alone who was 65 years of age or older.  The average household size was 2.44 and the average family size was 2.97.

In the county, the population was spread out, with 26.00% under the age of 18, 8.40% from 18 to 24, 24.50% from 25 to 44, 24.40% from 45 to 64, and 16.70% who were 65 years of age or older.  The median age was 38 years. For every 100 females there were 89.20 males.  For every 100 females age 18 and over, there were 84.90 males.

The median income for a household in the county was $22,099, and the median income for a family was $27,824. Males had a median income of $24,051 versus $17,995 for females. The per capita income for the county was $13,269.  About 21.70% of families and 27.00% of the population were below the poverty line, including 38.10% of those under age 18 and 27.00% of those age 65 or over.

Government

The county government is a constitutional body granted specific powers by the Constitution of Arkansas and the Arkansas Code. The quorum court is the legislative branch of the county government and controls all spending and revenue collection. Representatives are called justices of the peace and are elected from county districts every even-numbered year. The number of districts in a county vary from nine to fifteen, and district boundaries are drawn by the county election commission. The Woodruff County Quorum Court has nine members. Presiding over quorum court meetings is the county judge, who serves as the chief executive officer of the county. The county judge is elected at-large and does not vote in quorum court business, although capable of vetoing quorum court decisions.

A portion of Woodruff County is represented in the Arkansas State Senate by the Republican Ronald R. Caldwell, a real estate businessman from Wynne in Cross County. In the Arkansas House of Representatives, the local member is Michael John Gray, a Democrat and a farmer from Augusta who also holds a law degree.

In presidential elections, Woodruff County, like many rural white Southern counties in the Jim Crow and immediate post-Jim Crow eras, voted Democratic. However, it has broken that streak only four times in the past century: 1968 when it voted for George Wallace, 1972 when it voted for Richard Nixon, and 2016 and 2020 when it voted for Donald Trump. In the tradition of much of Arkansas since 2000, the county trended more Republican in 2020 as Trump won it by a far deeper margin than in 2016.

Infrastructure

Aviation
The Woodruff County Airport located along US 64 between Patterson and Augusta is the only public own/public use airport in the county. It is a general aviation airport, serving primarily agricultural (spraying) and recreational operations. For the twelve-month period ending June 30, 2014, the facility saw 5,500 general aviation operations.

Major highways

  U.S. Highway 49
  U.S. Highway 64
  Highway 17
  Highway 33
  Highway 37
  Highway 38
  Highway 78
  Highway 145
  Highway 260
  Highway 262
  Highway 269
  Highway 284
  Highway 306
  Highway 339

Utilities

The Arkansas Department of Health is responsible for the regulation and oversight of public water systems throughout the state. Woodruff County contains seven community water systems: Augusta Waterworks, Breckenridge Union Water Association (UWA), Cross County Rural Water System, Cotton Plant Waterworks, McCrory Waterworks, Patterson Waterworks, and West Woodruff Water District. Within the county, Augusta Waterworks has the largest retail population (2,284), followed by McCrory (1,647), and Breckenridge UWA (1,267). All community water systems in Woodruff County use groundwater as their source of raw water, except West Woodruff Water District, who purchases all water from Patterson.

See also

 List of lakes in Woodruff County, Arkansas
 National Register of Historic Places listings in Woodruff County, Arkansas

References
Notes

References

External links
 Woodruff County, Arkansas official site
 Woodruff County, Arkansas entry on the Encyclopedia of Arkansas History & Culture

 
1862 establishments in Arkansas
Populated places established in 1862